is a Japanese swimmer, who was selected to the national team to qualify for the 2012 Summer Olympics in London, after having accepted an invitation from FINA, based on her B-standard time. She competed in the women's 400 m freestyle, where she placed twenty-sixth in the heats, with a time of 4:12.33. She also joined the women's national team for the women's freestyle relay events, where she and her teammates finished in seventh and eighth place, respectively.

Takano is a sports science student at Doshisha University in Kyoto, Japan, and is currently a member of Itoman Club, being trained by Masato Nishiwaki.

References

Living people
Olympic swimmers of Japan
Swimmers at the 2012 Summer Olympics
Sportspeople from Osaka Prefecture
People from Ibaraki, Osaka
1994 births
Asian Games medalists in swimming
Swimmers at the 2014 Asian Games
Japanese female freestyle swimmers
Universiade medalists in swimming
Asian Games silver medalists for Japan
Medalists at the 2014 Asian Games
Universiade bronze medalists for Japan
Medalists at the 2015 Summer Universiade